Season one of Tu Cara me Suena premiered on September 23, 2013. Cacho Castaña, Elizabeth Vernacci and Joaquín Galán debuted conforming the panel of judges; Marley Wiebe presented the show.

Celebrities
The number of celebrities for this season, was eight. The cast included actors, comedians and singer from different ages and areas of the Argentine entertainment.

Scoring chart

Red numbers indicate the lowest score for each week
Green numbers indicate the highest score for each week
 the celebrity eliminated that week
 the celebrity did not perform as she/he advanced to the finale
 the winning celebrity
 the runner-up celebrity
 the third-place celebrity

Competitors scores

Main show details

Week 1 (April 16)

Running order

Imitations chart
The following chart contains the names of the iconic singers that the celebrities imitated every week.

 Highest scoring performance
 Lowest scoring performance

Guest celebrities

References

Your Face Sounds Familiar
2013 Argentine television seasons